Cannabis ruderalis is a variety, subspecies, or species of Cannabis native to Central and Eastern Europe and Russia. It contains a relatively low quantity of psychoactive compound tetrahydrocannabinol (THC) Some scholars accept C. ruderalis as its own species due to its unique traits and phenotypes which distinguish it from C. indica and C. sativa; others debate whether ruderalis is a subdivision under C. sativa.

Description 
According to one source, the plants have "thin, slightly fibrous stems" with little branching. The foliage is typically open with large leaves. C. ruderalis reaches maturity much quicker than other species of Cannabis, typically 5–7 weeks after being planted from seed.

Unlike other species of the genus, C. ruderalis enters the flowering stage based on the plant's maturity rather than its light cycle. With C. sativa and C. indica varieties, it is possible to keep the plant in the vegetative state indefinitely by maintaining a long daylight cycle. C. ruderalis, however, will enter the flowering stage regardless of daily light duration. Cannabis geneticists today refer to this feature as "auto-flowering" when C. ruderalis is cross-bred.

It has less tetrahydrocannabinal (THC) in its resin compared to other Cannabis species but is often high in cannabidiol (CBD).

Taxonomy 

It is widely accepted in the botany community that C. ruderalis is its own species, rather than a subspecies from C. sativa. It was classified in 1924 by D. E. Janischewsky, noting the visible differences in seed, shape and size from previously classified Cannabis sativa. C. ruderalis represent feral types of Cannabis which tend to have higher CBD levels, and do not depend on seasonal light changes to commence the flowering process.

C. ruderalis occupies regions farther north in latitude. Chemotaxonomic analysis reveals that C. ruderalis is shown to have lower tetrahydrocannabinol levels compared to feral and domesticated genotypes of C. sativa.

Etymology 
Cannabis ruderalis was first described by Russian botanist D. E. Janischewsky in 1924. The term ruderalis is derived from the Latin rūdera, which is the plural form of rūdus, a Latin word meaning rubble, lump, or rough piece of bronze. In botanical Latin, 'ruderalis' means 'weedy' or 'growing among waste'. A ruderal species refers to any plant that is the first to colonize land after a disturbance removing competition.

Distribution and habitat
C. ruderalis was first scientifically identified in 1924 in southern Siberia, although it grows wild in other areas of Russia. The Russian botanist, Janischewski, was studying wild Cannabis in the Volga River system and realized he had come upon a third species. C. ruderalis is a hardier variety grown in the northern Himalayas and southern states of the former Soviet Union, characterized by a more sparse, "weedy" growth.

Similar C. ruderalis populations can be found in most of the areas where hemp cultivation was once prevalent. The most notable region in North America is the midwestern United States, though populations occur sporadically throughout the United States and Canada. Large wild C. ruderalis populations are found in central and eastern Europe, most of them in Ukraine, Lithuania, Belarus, Latvia, Estonia and adjacent countries. Without human selection, these plants have lost many of the traits they were originally selected for, and have acclimated to their environment.

Cultivation
Seeds of C. ruderalis were brought to Amsterdam in the early 1980s in order to enhance the breeding program of the Seed Bank.

C. ruderalis has lower THC content than either C. sativa or C. indica, so it is rarely grown for recreational use and the shorter stature of C. ruderalis limits its application for hemp production. C. ruderalis strains are high in the cannabіnoid cannabidiol (CBD), so they are grown by some medical marijuana users.

C. ruderalis' early, plant-age triggered "autoflowering" characteristic (which offers some agricultural advantages over the photoperiodic flowering varieties) as well as its reputed resistance to insect and disease pressures makes it attractive to plant breeders.  C. indica strains are frequently cross-bred with C. ruderalis to produce autoflowering plants with high THC content, improved hardiness and reduced height. Cannabis x intersita Sojak, a strain identified in 1960, is a cross between C. sativa and C. ruderalis. Attempts to produce a Cannabis strain with a shorter growing season are another application of cultivating C. ruderalis. C. ruderalis when crossed with sativa and indica strains will carry the recessive autoflowering trait. Further crosses will stabilise this trait and give a plant which flowers automatically and can be fully mature in as little as 10 weeks.

Creation of auto-flowering cannabis strains 

Because C. ruderalis transitions from the vegetative stage to the flowering stage with age, as opposed to the light cycle required with photoperiod strains, it is bred with other household sativa and indica strains of cannabis to create "auto-flowering cannabis strains". These strains are favorable for cultivars because they exhibit the hardiness of ruderalis plants while still maintaining the medicinal effects of sativa and indica strains. Cultivators also favor ruderalis plants due to their reduced production time, typically finishing in 3–4 months rather than 6–8 months. The auto-flowering trait is extremely beneficial because it allows for multiple harvests in one outdoor growing season without the use of light deprivation techniques necessary for multiple harvest of photo-period strains. As a result of ruderalis genetics, auto-flowering plants typically have much higher CBD levels than photo-period cannabis.

Uses 
C. ruderalis is traditionally used in Russian and Mongolian folk medicine, especially for uses in treating depression. Because C. ruderalis is among the lowest THC producing biotypes of Cannabis, C. ruderalis is rarely used for recreational purposes.

In modern use, C. ruderalis has been crossed with Bedrocan strains to produce the strain Bediol for patients with medical prescriptions. C. sativa and C. indica strains bred with ruderalis plants typically exhibit the "autoflowering" phenotype exhibited by the C. ruderalis lineage, meaning that they flower when the plant reaches a certain maturity (usually ten weeks from seed) as opposed to flowering in accordance with the daily light schedules. The typically higher concentration of CBD makes ruderalis plants valuable for the treatment of anxiety or epilepsy. C. ruderalis is being used for the treatment of cancer, sclerosis, and loss of appetite.

References

External links
 
 

Cannabis strains
Flora of Nepal
Ruderal species